Meadow Portage is a community in the Canadian province of Manitoba.

Meadow Portage is the name of a two kilometre fur-trade era portage across the isthmus between Lake Winnipegosis and Lake Manitoba. The portage avoids a longer river-journey option north (via Long Island Bay to the West Waterhen River and Waterhen Lake, then a sharp turn south to the Waterhen River), a savings of about 70 km to Lake Manitoba.

Meadow Portage was originally inhabited by the Cree, Assiniboines, and the Ojibway peoples. The Hudson Bay Company then set up a trading post near the shore of Lake Manitoba in order to facilitate the fur trade. The telephone area code for Meadow Portage is (204).

Demographics 

References

Designated places in Manitoba
Northern communities in Manitoba